The Púchov culture was an archaeological culture named after site of Púchov-Skalka in Slovakia. Its probable bearer was the Celtic Cotini and/or Anartes tribes. It existed in northern and central Slovakia (although it also plausibly spread to the surrounding regions) between the 2nd century BCE and the 1st century CE. The Púchov culture developed from the Lusatian culture and it was influenced later by the Illyrian culture, the Celts, and by the beginning of the Christian era, the Dacians. Settlements were situated on moderate hill sides and near streams. The largest known religious, economic, and political center of the Púchov culture was the hill-fort of Havránok, famous for its traces of human sacrifice. As a result of the Dacian and Germanic tribal expansions at the beginning of the Common Era, the Púchov culture and its settlements began to decline, and its bearers were eventually assimilated into Dacian and other migrating tribes.

See also 
 Anartes
 Dacian-Celtic relations

Notes

References 
 Bolchazy Ladislaus J.,  Caplovic Dusan (2006) Illustrated Slovak History: A Struggle for Sovereignty in Central Europe, Publisher: Bolchazy Carducci Pub,

External links 

Archaeological cultures of Central Europe
Iron Age cultures of Europe
Celtic archaeological cultures
Archaeological cultures in Slovakia
Archaeological cultures in the Czech Republic
Archaeological cultures in Poland
Marcomanni